Raudsepa is a village in Rõuge Parish, Võru County in Estonia. It has a population of 37 (as of 7 February 2008).

References

Villages in Võru County